The Mokohinau Islands (Pokohinau) are a small group of islands that lie off the northeast coast of New Zealand's North Island. The main islands of the group include Fanal Island (Motukino), Burgess Island (Pokohinu), Flax Island (Hokoromea), and Trig Island (Atihau). Most of them are managed by the Department of Conservation as nature reserves and wildlife sanctuaries. Landing is not allowed without a permit, with the exception of Burgess Island, much of which is managed as a scenic reserve by the Department of Conservation. The remainder of Burgess Island is Crown Land and is administered by the Ministry of Transport.

Geology

The islands are volcanic stacks sitting at the edge of the continental shelf. Mokohinau formed between 10 and 8.5 million years ago, as a part of the Coromandel Volcanic Zone, which has since moved southwards to form the modern Taupō Volcanic Zone.

History

The islands were often visited seasonally by Māori for muttonbirding, harvesting the chicks of petrels for food and oil. Today, the main attractions for the rare tourists are the very clear waters teeming with wildlife.

Like many neighbouring Hauraki Gulf islands, the group is free of mammalian pests and being left to naturally regenerate. The Mokohinau Islands are home to a number of New Zealand's smallest endangered species, such as the Mokohinau skink, the robust skink and the Mokohinau stag beetle as well as a number of endangered plant species.

Burgess Island is also the location of the Mokohinau Islands Lighthouse, one of the most distant lights from the mainland. The light was built in 1883 and was one of the last in the country to be fully automated in 1980.

See also

 Hauraki Gulf
 List of islands of New Zealand

 Desert island

References

External links 
  Mokohinau Islands Scenic & Nature Reserves (Department of Conservation Website)
 Photographs of Mokohinau Islands held in Auckland Libraries' heritage collections.
Map of the Mokohinau Islands, (Department of Conservation Website)

Uninhabited islands of New Zealand
Islands of the Hauraki Gulf
Nature reserves in New Zealand
Islands of the Auckland Region